Sessi Octave Emile D'Almeida (born 20 November 1995) is a professional footballer who plays as a defensive midfielder for Ligue 2 club Pau FC. Born in France, he represents Benin at international level

Club career
D'Almeida made his debut for Bordeaux on 12 December 2013 in the UEFA Europa League group stage against Maccabi Tel Aviv, playing the first 75 minutes in the 1–0 away defeat before being substituted for Théo Pellenard.

On 23 August 2014, he made his Ligue 1 debut for Bordeaux, replacing André Biyogo Poko for the last 9 minutes of a 3–1 away win at OGC Nice.

After a successful trial with Barnsley in the summer of 2016, D'Almeida signed a two-year deal with the Championship club.

He was released by Blackpool at the end of the 2017–18 season.

On 13 July 2018, D'Almeida signed for League Two side Yeovil Town on a one-year deal with an option of extending for a second year. At the end of the 2018–19 season, D'Almeida was released by Yeovil following the club's relegation from the Football League.

On 24 July 2019, D'Almeida returned to France to sign for Ligue 2 side Valenciennes on a two-year contract.

International career
D'Almeida was called up to the Benin national team squad in 2014 for their matches 2015 Africa Cup of Nations qualification against Sao Tome. He made his debut for Benin in a 1–1 tie against Equatorial Guinea in 2015.

Career statistics

Club

International

Scores and results list Benin's goal tally first, score column indicates score after each D'Almeida goal.

References

External links
 

1995 births
Living people
Footballers from Bordeaux
Association football midfielders
Citizens of Benin through descent
Beninese footballers
Benin international footballers
French footballers
French sportspeople of Beninese descent
Ligue 1 players
Ligue 2 players
Championnat National 2 players
English Football League players
Primeira Liga players
FC Girondins de Bordeaux players
Barnsley F.C. players
Blackpool F.C. players
Paris Saint-Germain F.C. players
Yeovil Town F.C. players
Valenciennes FC players
C.D. Tondela players
Pau FC players
2019 Africa Cup of Nations players
French expatriate footballers
Beninese expatriate footballers
Beninese expatriate sportspeople in England
Expatriate footballers in England
French expatriate sportspeople in England
Beninese expatriate sportspeople in Portugal
French expatriate sportspeople in Portugal
Expatriate footballers in Portugal
Black French sportspeople